Erebus is a crater lying situated within the Margaritifer Sinus quadrangle (MC-19) region of the planet Mars, this extraterrestrial geological feature was visited by the Opportunity rover on the way to the much larger crater Victoria. It is named after the polar exploration vessel HMS Erebus which was used by James Clark Ross in 1841 to discover the Great Ice Barrier, now known as the Ross Ice Shelf. The rover was in the immediate vicinity of the crater from approximately sol 550 to 750 (October 2005 to March 2006).

This crater features two other minor named outcrops on the edges of this topographical depression. These include Payson Ridge and Olympia Ridge (see gallery below).

It is surrounded by what scientists are describing as "etched terrain", a region where rocks peek out from under the sand of Meridiani Planum.

However, it is very old and eroded, and is barely visible from the ground; it appears merely as a number of flat rocky outcrops encircling a region of dunes.

See also 
 Geography of Mars
 List of craters on Mars

External links and further reading
 
 
 Structure and Sedimentology of the Western Margin of Erebus Crater, Meridiani Planum, Mars
Erebrus and Victoria by Mars Express HRSC + SRC

Impact craters on Mars
Margaritifer Sinus quadrangle